Nompumelelo "Mpumi" Hlophe is a South African politician who is currently serving as Mpumalanga's Member of the Executive Council (MEC) for Finance, Economic Development and Tourism since October 2022. She is a member of the African National Congress (ANC).

Hlophe was elected to the Mpumalanga Provincial Legislature in the 2019 general elections, ranked tenth on the ANC's party list. She was appointed Chairperson of Committees ("chair of chairs") in the legislature. In April 2022, she was elected to the Provincial Executive Committee of the ANC's Mpumalanga branch; her candidacy was supported by the provincial ANC Youth League. In October of that year, she was appointed to the Mpumalanga Executive Council by Refilwe Mtsweni-Tsipane, the incumbent Premier of Mpumalanga; she succeeded Vusi Mkhatshwa as MEC for Finance, Economic Development and Tourism.

References

External links 

 

Living people
Members of the Mpumalanga Provincial Legislature
African National Congress politicians
21st-century South African politicians
Year of birth missing (living people)